Yu Fan (164–233), courtesy name Zhongxiang, was a Chinese essayist, politician, and writer of the state of Eastern Wu during the Three Kingdoms period of China. Initially a minor officer under Wang Lang, the Administrator of Kuaiji Commandery, Yu Fan later served under the warlord Sun Ce, who conquered the territories in the Jiangdong (or Wu) region in a series of campaigns from 194 to 199. Sun Ce regarded him highly and once enlisted his help in persuading Hua Xin, another commandery administrator, to surrender. After Sun Ce's death, Yu Fan continued serving under Sun Quan, Sun Ce's younger brother and successor, as a Cavalry Commandant. Sun Quan confined him for some time due to his rude and disrespectful behaviour, but released him in 219 and allowed him to accompany the general Lü Meng to attack Jing Province. During the Jing Province campaign, Yu Fan warned Lü Meng about a possible ambush when Lü Meng was celebrating a minor victory, and was proven right later.

Yu Fan was known for being very candid, outspoken and direct. As such, he offended Sun Quan several times – including instances when he was drunk – and did not get along well with many of his colleagues. He also mocked and belittled two enemy officers, Yu Jin and Mi Fang, who surrendered to Sun Quan. Sometime in the 220s, Sun Quan could no longer tolerate Yu Fan's disrespectful attitude and banished him to the remote Jiao Province in southern China. Yu Fan lived in exile for over a decade, during which he spent his time lecturing and writing. Even while living in exile, he was still concerned about state affairs, and he once wrote to Sun Quan to advise him against sending a fleet across the sea to attack the warlord Gongsun Yuan in northeastern China, but was ignored. When the fleet sustained heavy losses due to storms, Sun Quan regretted his decision and summoned Yu Fan back, but Yu Fan had already died by then.

Historical sources on Yu Fan's life
The authoritative historical source on Yu Fan's life is the Records of the Three Kingdoms (Sanguozhi), written by Chen Shou in the third century. In the fifth century, Pei Songzhi annotated the Sanguozhi by incorporating information from other sources to Chen Shou's original work and adding his personal commentary. The alternative texts used in the annotations to the Sanguozhi are: Wu Shu (吳書; Book of Wu), by Wei Zhao; Yu Fan Biezhuan (虞翻別傳; Unofficial Biography of Yu Fan), by an unknown writer; Jiang Biao Zhuan (江表傳), by Yu Pu; Kuaiji Dianlu (會稽典錄; Esteemed Records of Kuaiji), by an unknown writer.

Early life
Yu Fan was from Yuyao County (餘姚縣), Kuaiji Commandery, which is in present-day Yuyao, Zhejiang. The Yu clan, which he was from, was one of the four most influential clans in the Jiangdong region at the time. At a young age, he was already known for being studious and extraordinary. When he was 11, a guest who came to visit his elder brother ignored the young Yu Fan when he walked past him. Yu Fan later wrote to the guest, "I heard that amber does not contain rotten plant material and that magnets do not attract bent needles. Is it not appropriate for you to ignore me when you walked past me?" The guest was very surprised after reading Yu Fan's letter. Yu Fan attracted greater attention after this incident.

Service under Wang Lang
When Yu Fan became older, he served as an Officer of Merit (功曹) under Wang Lang, the Administrator (太守) of Kuaiji Commandery. In 196, the warlord Sun Ce, who was on a series of military campaigns in the Jiangdong (or Wu) region and had already conquered some territories, prepared to attack Kuaiji. Yu Fan was mourning the death of his father when he received news that Sun Ce was going to attack Kuaiji, so he rushed from his home to the commandery office and asked to meet Wang Lang. He was still dressed in mourning garments then. After entering the office, Yu Fan removed his mourning garments and urged Wang Lang to avoid confrontation with Sun Ce. Wang Lang ignored his advice and was defeated in battle by Sun Ce.

Yu Fan considered bringing Wang Lang north to Guangling Commandery (廣陵郡; around present-day Huai'an, Jiangsu) to evade Sun Ce, but Wang Lang, who believed in stories about the immortal Wang Fangping (王方平), wanted to travel to the "South Mountain" and take shelter there. Yu Fan then accompanied Wang Lang as they escaped from Kuaiji Commandery by sea and headed south to Houguan County (候官縣; in present-day Fuzhou, Fujian). At Houguan, the county chief initially denied them entry, but agreed after being persuaded by Yu Fan. In Houguan County, Wang Lang insisted on heading further south to Jiao Province to find the "South Mountain", but Yu Fan objected and said, "Those stories are nonsense. There is no South Mountain in Jiao Province for us to take shelter in." Wang Lang told Yu Fan later, "You have an elderly mother (to take care of). You can go back (to Kuaiji) now."

The Yu Fan Biezhuan provided a different account of the above events. It mentioned that Wang Lang sent Yu Fan to meet Hua Xin, the Administrator of Yuzhang Commandery (豫章郡; around present-day Nanchang, Jiangxi), and discuss the forming of a military alliance between Wang Lang and Hua Xin against Sun Ce. However, Yu Fan turned back before reaching his destination because he received news that Sun Ce's army was advancing towards Kuaiji Commandery. His father died during that period of time. Yu Fan did not return home immediately because he felt that he was still on a mission. He travelled day and night to Houguan County to meet Wang Lang, who then sent him home to attend his father's funeral.

Service under Sun Ce
Yu Fan was reinstated as an Officer of Merit by Sun Ce after he returned to Kuaiji Commandery. Sun Ce treated him like a friend and visited his residence. The Jiang Biao Zhuan recorded that Sun Ce wrote to Yu Fan: "I wish to work together with you from now. Please do not say I treated you like a lowly commandery-level officer."

Sun Ce was very fond of going on hunting excursions. Yu Fan told him: "You gathered a mob, used them to rein in the wandering scholar-gentry, and earned their fervent allegiance towards you. Even Emperor Gao of Han can't be compared to you. When you dress casually and venture out, the officials who accompany you usually don't have enough time to prepare for the trip, while the servants and soldiers are getting tiresome. A leader who doesn't behave in a serious manner doesn't command respect. The White Dragon transformed into a fish for fun and ended up being trapped by the fisherman Yuqie (豫且); the White Serpent behaved recklessly and ended up being slain by Liu Bang. I hope you will be more careful." Sun Ce replied: "You're right. However, sometimes, when I'm thinking hard, I feel frustrated if I were to sit down and think. As such, I venture out in search of insight and inspiration."

The Wu Shu recorded that Sun Ce once led a military expedition against the Shanyue and ventured into the hills alone after slaying the Shanyue chief and sending his men to pursue and destroy the remaining Shanyue forces. He encountered Yu Fan, who asked him where his bodyguards were. When Sun Ce told him that he had ordered his bodyguards to join the rest of his men in attacking the Shanyue, Yu Fan exclaimed, "This is so dangerous!" He then asked Sun Ce to dismount from his horse and said, "The terrain here is deep and dangerous. You can't control your horse well under such conditions, so you should travel on foot, guide your horse along, and arm yourself with a bow and arrows. I'm good in using a spear and I'll lead the way." After reaching flat ground, Sun Ce mounted his horse again and asked Yu Fan, "You don't have a horse. What are you going to do?" Yu Fan replied, "I can travel on foot. I'm capable of travelling 300 li in a day. Since the start of the campaigns, no one has been able to match my pace. You can try letting a horse run and I'll catch up with it on foot." They encountered a signaller at the main road. Sun Ce took the signaller's horn and blew it. His men recognised the sound of the horn and rushed there to join him. They patrolled the area and pacified the three commanderies.

Persuading Hua Xin to surrender to Sun Ce

The Jiang Biao Zhuan recorded that in 199, when Sun Ce was leading an army to attack Jiangxia Commandery (江夏郡; around present-day Xinzhou District, Wuhan, Hubei), he passed by Yuzhang Commandery along the way and wanted to conquer it. He invited Yu Fan to meet him and asked Yu Fan to persuade the Administrator, Hua Xin, to surrender. Yu Fan travelled to Yuzhang Commandery and succeeded in convincing Hua Xin to surrender by pointing out that he stood no chance against Sun Ce. Hua Xin surrendered to Sun Ce the following day.

After capturing Yuzhang Commandery, Sun Ce led his army back to Wu Commandery (around present-day Suzhou, Jiangsu), where he rewarded his subjects for their contributions. He told Yu Fan that he heard that many officials serving in the Han imperial capital, Xu (許; present-day Xuchang, Henan) had the impression that Jiangdong had no talents, so he wanted to send Yu Fan there to meet them and prove them wrong. He also considered sending Zhang Hong, but he still preferred Yu Fan. Yu Fan refused and said, "I'm like one of your treasured possessions. You might lose me if you show me to others and they want me. That's why I don't want to go there." Sun Ce laughed and said, "I still have military campaigns to complete so I can't return home yet. You're like my Xiao He. I intend to let you return to Kuaiji as an Officer of Merit to help me guard the commandery." Yu Fan travelled back to Kuaiji Commandery three days later.

Pei Songzhi commented that the Jiang Biao Zhuan'''s account of Yu Fan persuading Hua Xin to surrender is less reliable as compared to another account from the Wu Li. He believed that Hua Xin was not militarily weaker than Wang Lang (as suggested in the Jiang Biao Zhuan) and he might have resisted Sun Ce if he was in control of Kuaiji Commandery instead of Yuzhang Commandery.

Events after Sun Ce's death
Yu Fan was appointed as the Chief (長) of Fuchun County (富春縣; in present-day Fuyang, Zhejiang) later. When Sun Ce died in the year 200, many county-level officials wanted to travel to Wu Commandery to attend his funeral. Yu Fan disapproved because he was worried that the Shanyue tribes would take advantage of their absence to cause trouble in the counties, hence he remained in Fuchun County but wore mourning garments to express his grief. The other officials followed suit and the area was peaceful.

The Wu Shu and Kuaiji Dianlu recorded an incident involving Sun Hao (孫暠), a cousin of Sun Ce. Sun Hao held the appointment of General of the Household Who Establishes Martial Might (定武中郎將) and was stationed at Wucheng County (烏程縣; in present-day Huzhou, Zhejiang). After Sun Ce died and was succeeded by his younger brother, Sun Quan, Sun Hao rallied his subordinates, formed an army, and prepared to attack Kuaiji Commandery. When Yu Fan heard about it, he ordered the people in Kuaiji Commandery to hold their positions and await orders from their new lord (Sun Quan) while he met Sun Hao in person. He warned Sun Hao: "Our former lord had passed away. Sun Quan is now our new lord. I am prepared to lead everyone in Kuaiji to defend the commandery and eliminate any threat to our new lord. You better reconsider your decision." Sun Hao retreated.

Pei Songzhi pointed out a discrepancy between the Sanguozhi account and the Wu Shu and Kuaiji Dianlu accounts about the appointment held by Yu Fan around 200 when Sun Ce died. The Sanguozhi mentioned that Yu Fan was the Chief of Fuchun County, but the Wu Shu and Kuaiji Dianlu suggested that Yu Fan was still serving as an Officer of Merit in Kuaiji Commandery at the time.

Service under Sun Quan
Yu Fan was later nominated as a maocai (茂才; an outstanding civil servant). The Han central government in Xu (許; present-day Xuchang, Henan) offered him a position to be an Imperial Clerk (侍御史) but he declined the offer. The warlord Cao Cao, who then held the nominal appointment of Minister of Works (司空) even though he controlled the central government, also wanted to recruit Yu Fan to serve in his office. When Yu Fan heard about it, he rejected Cao Cao's offer and remarked, "The robber Zhi wishes to use his excess wealth to corrupt good people."

Yu Fan made annotations to the I Ching and sent his writings to Kong Rong, the Minister Steward (少府) in the Han central government. Kong Rong praised Yu Fan's writings and remarked that they made him realise that there was "more about the beauty of the southeast than just the bamboo arrows of Kuaiji". Zhang Hong, another official serving in Kuaiji Commandery, also wrote mentioned Yu Fan in a letter to Kong Rong: "Scholars used to scorn Yu Zhongxiang. A beautiful piece of jade may look simple on the outside, but it sparkles after it is polished. The ridicule he faced then had no negative effect on him."

Sun Quan appointed Yu Fan as a Cavalry Commandant (騎都尉). Yu Fan was known for being very candid and direct in giving advice to Sun Quan, but, in doing so, he offended his lord on many occasions and made him unhappy. Besides, he was known for exhibiting socially deviant behaviour, hence he did not get along well with others and was slandered by them. Sun Quan confined him in Jing County (涇縣), Danyang Commandery (丹楊郡; in present-day Chun'an County, Zhejiang).

Role in the conquest of Jing Province

In 219, Sun Quan's general Lü Meng planned to attack Liu Bei's territories in southern Jing Province, which were guarded by Liu Bei's general Guan Yu. He claimed that he was ill and returned to Jianye (建業; present-day Nanjing, Jiangsu) to put Guan Yu off guard. He also managed to persuade Sun Quan to release Yu Fan from confinement and let Yu Fan accompany him, because Yu Fan had medical skills and could help to treat his illness.

Later that year, during the invasion of Jing Province, after Lü Meng received the surrender of Mi Fang, the Administrator of Nan Commandery (南郡; around present-day Jiangling County, Hubei), he did not immediately order his forces to occupy the city and instead held celebrations on the beach. Yu Fan reminded Lü Meng, "As of now, only General Mi has surrendered to us. We cannot trust that everyone in the city is willing to surrender too. Why are you celebrating here instead of quickly taking control of the city?" Lü Meng followed Yu Fan's advice. There was actually a planned ambush in the city but it was not successfully carried out because Lü Meng heeded Yu Fan's warning in time.

After Guan Yu was defeated, Sun Quan ordered Yu Fan to use divination to predict the outcome, and Yu Fan concluded, "He'll lose his head within two days." Yu Fan's prediction came true. Sun Quan remarked, "You may not be as good as Fuxi, but you're comparable to Dongfang Shuo."

Mocking Yu Jin
Cao Cao's general Yu Jin was captured by Guan Yu during the Battle of Fancheng and was held captive in Nan Commandery. After Sun Quan seized control of Nan Commandery, he released Yu Jin and treated him with respect. One day, when Sun Quan travelling on horseback, he asked Yu Jin to ride beside him. Yu Fan saw that and shouted at Yu Jin, "You're a surrendered prisoner-of-war. How dare you ride side-by-side with my lord!" He wanted to hit Yu Jin with his horsewhip but Sun Quan ordered him to stop. Later, when Yu Jin joined Sun Quan in a feast with his subjects on board a ship, he shed tears when he heard music being played. Yu Fan mocked him, "Are you pretending to be pitiful?" Sun Quan was very unhappy with Yu Fan.

In 220, after Cao Cao died, his son Cao Pi forced Emperor Xian to abdicate in his favour, thereby ending the Han dynasty. Cao Pi then established the state of Cao Wei. Sun Quan made peace with Cao Pi and planned to send Yu Jin back to Wei, but Yu Fan objected and urged him to execute Yu Jin. Sun Quan did not listen to Yu Fan. On the day of Yu Jin's departure, Sun Quan's subjects, including Yu Fan, came to see him off. Yu Fan told Yu Jin, "Don't you ever think there are no great men in Wu. It is just that my advice wasn't heeded." Despite being humiliated by Yu Fan during his stay in Wu, Yu Jin spoke highly of Yu Fan when he returned to Wei. Cao Pi even prepared a seat for Yu Fan even though he knew that it would probably remain permanently unoccupied.

Showing disrespect to Sun Quan
In 220, Cao Pi made Sun Quan a vassal king under the title "King of Wu" (吳王) after Sun Quan pledged allegiance to him. Sun Quan threw a feast to celebrate with his subjects. During the feast, he moved around and personally poured wine for his subjects. When he came to Yu Fan, he saw that Yu Fan was lying on the ground and appeared to be drunk, so he walked away. Yu Fan immediately sat up as soon as Sun Quan walked away. Sun Quan thought that Yu Fan was deliberately snubbing him, so he turned furious, drew his sword and wanted to kill Yu Fan. His subjects were all shocked and fearful. Only Liu Ji stood up, grabbed Sun Quan, and pleaded with him to spare Yu Fan. Liu Ji said, "If Your Majesty kills a good man when you're drunk, even if Yu Fan is in the wrong, who would understand the truth? Your Majesty is famous and respected because you showed acceptance and tolerance towards virtuous and talented people over the years. Is it worth ruining your good reputation in just one day?" Sun Quan said, "If Cao Mengde can kill Kong Wenju, why can't I do the same to Yu Fan?" Liu Ji replied, "Mengde killed virtuous people recklessly, hence he didn't win over people's hearts. Your Majesty promotes moral values and righteousness, and wishes to be compared to Yao and Shun. Why are you comparing yourself to him?" Sun Quan then spared Yu Fan and instructed his men to ignore his orders in the future if he was not sober when he ordered someone to be executed.

Insulting Mi Fang
Yu Fan once sailed along the river and encountered Mi Fang. The sailors on Mi Fang's boat wanted Yu Fan's boat to give way, so they shouted, "Make way for the General's boat!" Yu Fan replied angrily, "How can you serve a lord when you've already abandoned the values of loyalty and righteousness? Are you still fit to be called a 'General' after you've lost two of your previous lord's strongholds?" Mi Fang did not reply and he drew the curtains on his boat and instructed his men to give way.

In another incident, Yu Fan was riding in a carriage when he passed by Mi Fang's garrison along the way. Mi Fang's men closed the gates so Yu Fan was unable to pass through. Yu Fan was furious and he shouted, "You leave the gates open when they are supposed to be closed, and you close them when they are supposed to be opened. Is this what you should be doing?" Mi Fang felt ashamed when he heard Yu Fan's remark.

Exile to Jiao Province and death
Yu Fan was known to be very direct in his speech and there were many instances when he offended people while he was drunk. Once, when Sun Quan and Zhang Zhao were talking about immortals, Yu Fan pointed at Zhang Zhao and shouted, "They are all dead people, yet you call them immortals. How can there be immortals in this world?" At this point, Sun Quan could no longer tolerate Yu Fan so he exiled him to Jiao Province. While he was in exile, Yu Fan held lectures and had hundreds of students. He also annotated ancient classics such as the Daodejing, Lunyu and Guoyu. He was friendly with Ding Lan (丁覽) and Xu Ling (徐陵). Both of them started their careers as low-ranking officers serving in county offices, but their lives changed after they met Yu Fan because they rose through the ranks and became famous later on.

The Yu Fan Biezhuan recorded that in 229, after Sun Quan proclaimed himself emperor and established the state of Eastern Wu, Yu Fan wrote a memorial to congratulate him. He also expressed remorse for his past mistakes and hinted that he hoped that Sun Quan would allow him to return to Jianye (建業; in present-day Nanjing, Jiangsu).

Yu Fan spent more than a decade living in exile. He died at the age of 70 (by East Asian age reckoning). Sun Quan permitted Yu Fan's family to bring his remains back to Yuyao County for burial. He also freed them from exile.

When Yu Fan was living in exile, he was still very concerned about state affairs. For example, he strongly opposed Sun Quan's idea of sending an army across the sea to attack the warlord Gongsun Yuan in Liaodong (in northeastern China). However, he did not dare to voice his opinion directly to Sun Quan, so he asked Lü Dai to help him pass his message to Sun Quan, but Lü Dai did not do so. Sun Quan heard about it later and was so angry with Yu Fan for opposing his decision that he banished Yu Fan further south to Mengling County (猛陵縣), Cangwu Commandery (蒼梧郡), which is located in present-day Guangxi. Sun Quan sent a fleet to attack Gongsun Yuan, but he regretted his decision later when storms caused the fleet to sustain heavy damage and losses. He remembered Yu Fan and quickly sent messengers to Jiao Province to fetch Yu Fan back to Jianye, but Yu Fan was already dead by then.

Family
Yu Fan had 11 sons. Among them, the notable ones were Yu Si, Yu Zhong, Yu Song and Yu Bing. The names of his other sons were not recorded in history.

Appraisal
Chen Shou, who wrote Yu Fan's biography in the Records of the Three Kingdoms, noted that Yu Fan was very candid and direct in his speech. He also commented that Sun Quan's lack of tolerance for Yu Fan was a sign that Sun Quan was not as magnanimous as he seemed.

In Romance of the Three Kingdoms
Yu Fan appeared as a character in the 14th-century historical novel Romance of the Three Kingdoms, which romanticises the history of the late Eastern Han dynasty and the Three Kingdoms period. In chapter 43, Yu Fan was one of the Wu scholars who debated with Zhuge Liang over Sun Quan's decision to ally with Liu Bei against Cao Cao. In chapter 75, during Lü Meng's invasion of Jing Province, Yu Fan succeeded in persuaded Guan Yu's subordinate Fu Shiren to surrender.

See also
 Lists of people of the Three Kingdoms

Notes

References
 Citations from Sanguozhi volume 57

 Chen, Shou (3rd century). Records of the Three Kingdoms (Sanguozhi).
 Citations from annotations in the Sanguozhi Pei, Songzhi (5th century). Annotations to Records of the Three Kingdoms (Sanguozhi zhu).
 Other sources

 
 Luo, Guanzhong (14th century). Romance of the Three Kingdoms (Sanguo Yanyi).
 Sima, Guang (1084). Zizhi Tongjian''.

164 births
233 deaths
Chinese spiritual writers
Eastern Wu essayists
Eastern Wu politicians
Han dynasty essayists
Han dynasty politicians from Zhejiang
Officials under Sun Quan
Sun Ce and associates
Politicians from Ningbo
Writers from Ningbo